This is a list of Pakistani films that are scheduled to be released in 2023.

January–March

April–June

See also 
 List of highest-grossing Pakistani films
 List of highest-grossing films in Pakistan
 Lists of Pakistani films

References 

2023
Pakistan